The Rusk County Historical Society Museum is a museum in Ladysmith, Wisconsin, United States. The museum contains over 9,000 artifacts relating to the history of Rusk County. The Rusk County Historical Society was incorporated in 1955 and is a non-profit organization. The historical society has a museum that is located at the Rusk County Fairgrounds in Ladysmith, WI. The museum is open from 12:30-4:30 on weekends Memorial Day through Labor Day. The objectives of the society are the discovery, preservation, and public dissemination of the history of Rusk County and the State of Wisconsin.

The museum is an open air style museum that consists of several different buildings that are connected by walkways.  Buildings at the museum include the following:
 Henry Golat Welcome and Research Building
 Little Red Schoolhouse 
 Teacher's Cabin
 Gates County Courthouse
 Log Cabin
 Flambeau Mine Visitors Center
 Jones LeCount Military Building
 Logging and Farm Equipment Building
 Glen Flora Jail
 Farm Machine Shed
 NATO Tank

References

External links
Rusk County Historical Society Museum
Rusk County Historical Society Museum Facebook

Museums in Rusk County, Wisconsin
History museums in Wisconsin
Open-air museums in Wisconsin